Carlos Cunha Filho (born August 11, 1999) is a Brazilian race car driver. He is the son of Carlos Cunha, businessman and former race car driver in the 1990s.

Racing record

Career summary

Motorsports career results

American open–wheel racing
(key) (Races in bold indicate pole position; races in italics indicate fastest lap)

Pro Mazda Championship

* Season still in progress

References

External links
 
 

1999 births
Living people
Brazilian racing drivers
Indy Pro 2000 Championship drivers
Racing drivers from São Paulo
Brazilian Formula Three Championship drivers
Team Pelfrey drivers
Juncos Hollinger Racing drivers